Realtime Worlds Ltd. was a British video game developer based in Dundee, Scotland. The company was founded by David Jones in 2002. After developing Crackdown (2007) and APB: All Points Bulletin (2009), Realtime Worlds filed for administration in August 2010.

Foundation
Realtime Worlds was founded in early 2002 by David Jones, who was previously a founder of DMA Design and the creator of the game series Grand Theft Auto and Lemmings. Much of the initial workforce was previously employed at Rage Software, as Rage Games (Scotland). During this period the core team who would go on to form Realtime Worlds developed first-person shooter game Mobile Forces for Microsoft Windows. Upon the demise of Rage Software, Dave Jones bought out Rage Games (Scotland) to form Realtime Worlds.

Development
On 11 December 2006, New Enterprise Associates announced an investment of 30 million US dollars into Realtime Worlds.

Their first release under the name Realtime Worlds was the critically acclaimed 2007 action-adventure third-person sandbox game Crackdown, an Xbox 360 exclusive title. In 2010, they released a massively multiplayer online game for Microsoft Windows, titled APB (All Points Bulletin), which had been in development for five years, and was hoped to generate upwards of "hundreds of millions of pounds".

In 2007, at Develop magazine's Industry Excellence Awards, the company was nominated in a record-breaking seven categories, and took home the awards for Innovation and New UK/European Studio. Company chairman Ian Hetherington was also crowned Development Legend. At the 2007 British Academy of Film and Television Arts Video Game Awards ceremony, Crackdown was nominated in five categories and won two, for Action and Adventure and Use of Audio. In 2008, Crackdown was honored as Best Debut by the GDC's Game Developers Choice awards.

On 14 February 2008, it was announced that Realtime Worlds had secured US$50M in funding from a consortium led by venture capitalists Maverick Capital and New Enterprise Associates and joined by the WPP Group, a London-based advertising firm. The funds are expected to be used towards "continued expansion".

On 27 April 2009, Gary Dale left his COO position at Take-Two Interactive to become CEO of the company. Dave Jones stepped down as CEO of the company and took the title of creative director.

On 1 May 2010, Realtime Worlds annual accounts revealed a further US$21M investment was made in the company in January 2010. This brings the total investment in Realtime Worlds since 2006 to US$101M.

On 29 June 2010, after five years of development, with lengthy delays, APB was released to the general public. As of 15 July 2010, APB has a metacritic score of 58/100. On 7 July 2010, Realtime Worlds announced that it was to restructure its work force to focus more on providing "total support" for APB.

On 16 September 2010, Realtime Worlds announced that it will be shutting down APB'''s servers for good.

Administration and closure

On 17 August 2010, six weeks after the release of APB, Realtime Worlds entered administration with Begbies Traynor, announcing major layoffs to their Dundee division, and mostly closing their Colorado office.  References state that 50 employees would be held to maintain the game APB All Points Bulletin'', though it was unclear to what extent.  Joint administration was conducted by Paul Dounis and Ken Pattullo of the Begbies Traynor Group.

Dounis stated: "Our intention is to continue trading the company while we attempt to find a going concern buyer which will safeguard the future of the business."  The following day (18 August), Begbies Traynor announced that Realtime Worlds had attracted interest from potential buyers "from both sides of the Atlantic."  On 19 August, Begbies Traynor confirmed that a buyer needed to be found for the company as a going concern by the end of September. If that deadline was not achieved, liquidation was the most likely option for Realtime Worlds.

On 16 September 2010, the remainder of the Realtime Worlds staff was laid off with a temporary skeleton crew left in place to close the offices in Dundee and Colorado.

On 12 November 2010, bidding on thousands of Realtime Worlds lots ended, with industrial auctioneer Sweeney Kincaid managing the sales and collections. The lots included monitors, computers and games consoles.

Games

References

External links
Official website via Internet Archive

 
Video game companies established in 2002
Companies based in Dundee
Defunct companies of Scotland
Companies that have entered administration in the United Kingdom
Defunct video game companies of the United Kingdom
Video game development companies
2002 establishments in Scotland
Video game companies disestablished in 2010
2010 disestablishments in Scotland